James Ralph "Spud" Johnson (December 1856 – February 1928) was a 19th-century Major League Baseball player for three seasons, two for the Columbus Solons of the American Association and one season for the Cleveland Spiders of the National League.

Career

Johnson was signed by the Solons on January 15, 1889, when after the  season the Kansas City team of the Western Association folded and was sold to the Kansas City team of the American Association. A dispute quickly surfaced between the two teams about Johnson and his rights. On March 19, Columbus settled the dispute by paying Kansas City $500. His best season came in  when he led the Association in runs batted in with 113, while finishing in the top five in most offensive categories including his .346 batting average, 18 triples, and 186 hits.

In 381 games over three seasons, Johnson posted a .302 batting average (400-for-1324) with 246 runs, 4 home runs, 238 RBI and 93 stolen bases.

Nothing much is known of his whereabouts after he left organized baseball.

See also
 List of Major League Baseball annual runs batted in leaders

References

External links

1856 births
19th-century baseball players
Canadian expatriate baseball players in the United States
Columbus Solons players
Cleveland Spiders players
Year of death missing
Major League Baseball players from Canada
Major League Baseball outfielders
Topeka (minor league baseball) players
Kansas City Blues (baseball) players
Rochester Flour Cities players